Ravgga is a fortune-telling fish god in Sami mythology.

References

Fish gods
Sámi gods
Oracular gods
Animal gods